Maa  is a 1959 Indian Oriya film directed by Nitai Palit.

Cast
 Gour Prasad Ghose
 Chandana
 Laxmipriya Mahapatra

Music

References

1959 films
1950s Odia-language films